Isopogon, commonly known as conesticks, conebushes or coneflowers, is a genus of about forty species of flowering plants in the family Proteaceae, and are endemic to Australia. They are shrubs with rigid leaves, bisexual flowers in a dense spike or "cone" and the fruit is a small, hairy nut.

Description
Plants in the genus Isopogon are erect or prostrate shrubs with rigid, usually compound, rarely simple leaves. Compound leaves are deeply divided with flat or cylindrical lobes. The flowers are usually arranged on the ends of branches, usually surrounded by bracts, in a more or less conical or spherical spike. Each flower is bisexual and symmetrical, the tepals spreading as the flower develops, the lower part persisting unit the fruit expands. The fruit are fused to form a woody cone-like to more or less spherical structure, each fruit a nut with bracts that eventually fall and release the fruit. Isopogon have 13 haploid chromosomes.

Taxonomy
The genus Isopogon was first formally described in 1809 by Joseph Knight in On the cultivation of the plants belonging to the natural order of Proteeae, preempting publication of the same name by Robert Brown in his book On the natural order of plants called Proteaceae.

Species list
The following is a list of species, subspecies and varieties of Isopogon accepted by the Australian Plant Census as at November 2020:

 Isopogon adenanthoides Meisn. (W.A.) - spider coneflower
 Isopogon alcicornis Diels (W.A.) - elkhorn coneflower
 Isopogon anemonifolius (Salisb.) Knight (N.S.W.) - broad-leaved drumsticks
 Isopogon anethifolius (Salisb.) Knight (N.S.W.) - narrow-leaved drumsticks
 Isopogon asper R.Br. (W.A.) 
 Isopogon attenuatus R.Br. (W.A.)
 Isopogon axillaris R.Br. (W.A.)
 Isopogon baxteri R.Br. (W.A.) - Stirling Range coneflower
 Isopogon buxifolius R.Br. (W.A.)
 Isopogon buxifolius R.Br. var. buxifolius
 Isopogon buxifolius var. obovatus (R.Br.)Benth.
 Isopogon ceratophyllus R.Br. (S.A., Vic., Tas.) - wild Irishman, horny cone bush
 Isopogon crithmifolius F.Muell. (W.A.)
 Isopogon cuneatus R.Br. (W.A.) - coneflower
 Isopogon dawsonii  F.Muell. ex R.T.Baker (N.S.W.) - Nepean cone bush
 Isopogon divergens R.Br. (W.A.) - spreading coneflower
 Isopogon drummondii Hügel ex Jacques (W.A.)
 Isopogon dubius (R.Br.) Druce (W.A.) - pincushion coneflower
 Isopogon fletcheri F.Muell. (N.S.W.) - Fletcher's drumsticks
 Isopogon formosus R.Br. (W.A.) - rose coneflower
 Isopogon formosus subsp. dasylepis (Meisn.) Foreman
 Isopogon formosus R.Br. subsp. formosus Isopogon gardneri Foreman (W.A.)
 Isopogon heterophyllus Meisn. (W.A.)
 Isopogon inconspicuus (Meisn.) Foreman (W.A.) 
 Isopogon latifolius R.Br. (W.A.)
 Isopogon linearis Meisn. (W.A.)
 Isopogon longifolius R.Br. (W.A.)
 Isopogon mnoraifolius McGill. (N.S.W.)
 Isopogon panduratus Hislop & Rye (W.A.)
 Isopogon panduratus subsp. palustris Hislop & Rye
 Isopogon panduratus Hislop & Rye subsp. panduratus Isopogon petiolaris R.Br. (Qld., N.S.W.)
 Isopogon polycephalus R.Br. (W.A.) - clustered coneflower
 Isopogon prostratus McGill. (N.S.W., Vic.) - prostrate cone-bush
 Isopogon pruinosus Hislop & Rye (W.A.)
 Isopogon pruinosus subsp. glabellus Hislop & Rye
 Isopogon pruinosus Hislop & Rye subsp. pruinosus Isopogon robustus Foreman ex N.Gibson (W.A.)
 Isopogon scabriusculus Meisn. (W.A.)
 Isopogon scabriusculus subsp. pubifloris Foreman
 Isopogon scabriusculus Meisn. subsp. scabriusculus Isopogon scabriusculus subsp. stenophyllus Foreman
 Isopogon spathulatus R.Br. (W.A.)
 Isopogon sphaerocephalus Lindl. (W.A.) - drumstick isopogon
 Isopogon teretifolius R.Br. (W.A.) - nodding coneflower
 Isopogon tridens (Meisn.) F.Muell. (W.A.) - three-toothed coneflower
 Isopogon trilobus R.Br. (W.A.) - barrel coneflower
 Isopogon uncinatus R.Br. (W.A.)
 Isopogon villosus Meisn. (W.A.)

Two new species of Isopogon, I. autumnalis (10 December 2019) and I. nutans'' (5 May 2020) have been described but the names have not been accepted by the Australian Plant Census as at November 2020.

References

External links

 
Proteaceae genera
Proteales of Australia
Endemic flora of Australia